The Czech Footballer of the Year is awarded annually in the Czech Republic by the Czech Football Association (FAČR) to people connected with women's football. Czech players in the Czech Republic and abroad are eligible. Awards for young player and coach of the year are also given.

See also

 List of sports awards honoring women

References

Football in the Czech Republic
Czech W
Women's association football trophies and awards
Czech sports trophies and awards
Annual events in the Czech Republic
Awards established in 2002
2002 establishments in the Czech Republic
Women's association football player of the year awards